Norman Williams may refer to:

 Norman Williams (Australian cricketer) (1899-1947), Australian cricketer
 Norman Williams (New Zealand cricketer) (1864-1928), New Zealand cricketer
 Norman Williams (RAAF officer), Royal Australian Air Force officer
 Norman Williams (politician), Vermont attorney and politician
 Norman Powell Williams, Anglo-Catholic theologian
 Sir Norman Stanley Williams, British surgeon
 Aron Kincaid (born Norman Neale Williams II), American actor